The Neacola Mountains are the northernmost subrange of the Aleutian Range in the U.S. state of Alaska. The range is named for the Neacola River which bounds it to the north  and drains the highest and most rugged peaks of the group. They are bordered on the southeast by the Chigmit Mountains, another subrange of the Aleutian Range, on the northeast by the Tordrillo Mountains,  and on the west and southwest by the lakes and lowlands of Lake Clark National Park and Preserve. The highest peak is Mount Neacola (also known as "Neacola Peak"), 9,426 feet (2,873 m) although the name is not officially recognized.

These mountains have not seen extensive exploration, due to their remoteness, typically poor weather, and lack of truly high peaks. However they are rugged and offer many climbing possibilities of an exploratory nature. Noted climber Fred Beckey visited the range in the early 1970s; in 1991, when he was "spiritual leader" of the expedition which made the first ascent of Mount Neacola; and again in 2004. Other recorded climbing visits occurred in 1979 and 1995.

Sources
 American Alpine Journal, 1980, 1992, 1996, 2005.

References

Aleutian Range
Mountains of Kenai Peninsula Borough, Alaska
Mountains of Lake and Peninsula Borough, Alaska